This is a list of Argentinian women Twenty20 International cricketers. In April 2018, the ICC decided to grant full Twenty20 International (T20I) status to all its members. Therefore, all Twenty20 matches played between Argentina Women and other ICC members after 1 July 2018 will have T20I status.

This list comprises all members of the Argentina women's cricket team who have played at least one T20I match. It is initially arranged in the order in which each player won her first Twenty20 cap. Where more than one player won her first Twenty20 cap in the same match, those players are listed alphabetically by surname. Argentina Women played their first T20I matches during the 2019 South American Cricket Championship in October 2019.

Key

List of players
Statistics are correct as of 16 October 2022.

References 

Argentina